Agustín Guiffrey (born 3 November 1997) is an Argentine professional footballer who plays as a midfielder for Los Andes.

Career
Guiffrey played for Defensores de Pronunciamiento and Las Achiras at youth level, prior to joining Patronato in 2016. He was moved into the senior squad of Patronato midway through the 2017–18 campaign, with the midfielder making his debut for the Argentine Primera División side on 19 February 2018 during a 3–0 victory over Chacarita Juniors; having been an unused substitute a week before against Vélez Sarsfield. Guiffrey appeared five further times for Patronato in his maiden season, as Patronato finished in nineteenth place. He was loaned to Santamarina in July 2019.

Career statistics
.

References

External links

1997 births
Living people
Argentine people of French descent
Sportspeople from Entre Ríos Province
Argentine footballers
Association football midfielders
Argentine Primera División players
Primera Nacional players
Club Atlético Patronato footballers
Club y Biblioteca Ramón Santamarina footballers
Club Atlético Los Andes footballers